Amdo Tibetan (also called Am kä) is the Tibetic language spoken in Amdo (now mostly in Qinghai, some in Ngawa and Gannan). It has two varieties, the farmer dialects and the nomad dialects.

Amdo is one of the three branches of traditional classification of Tibetic languages (the other two being Khams Tibetan and Ü-Tsang). In terms of mutual intelligibility, Amdo speakers cannot communicate even at a basic level with the Ü-Tsang branch (including Lhasa Tibetan).

The nomad dialect of Amdo Tibetan is closer to classical written Tibetan as it preserves the word-initial consonant clusters and it is non-tonal, both now elided in the Ü-Tsang branch (including Lhasa Tibetan). Hence, its conservatism in phonology has become a source of pride among Amdo Tibetans.

Dialects
Dialects are:
North Kokonor (Kangtsa, Themchen, Arik, etc.)
West Kokonor (Dulan, Na'gormo, etc.), 
Southeast Kokonor (Jainca, Thrika, Hualong, etc.)
Labrang (Labrang, Luchu)
Golok (Machen, Matö, Gabde)
Ngapa (Ngapa, Dzorge, Dzamthang)
Kandze

Bradley (1997) includes Thewo and Choni as close to Amdo if not actually Amdo dialects.

Hua (2001) contains word lists of the Xiahe County 夏河, Tongren County 同仁, Xunhua County 循化, Hualong County 化隆, Hongyuan County 红原, and Tianjun County 天峻 dialects of Amdo Tibetan in Gansu and Qinghai provinces.

Phonology

Consonants 

 Retroflex stop sounds  may also be pronounced as affricate sounds  in free variation.
 Voiced consonants are often heard as pre-breathy-voiced (i.e.  ) among different dialects.
  may also be heard as a palatal  in free variation.
 Labio-dental fricatives  and  may also occur in words of foreign origin.

Vowels 

  may typically be heard as more fronted before a mid vowel , and may also be realized as an open-mid  in some environments.

Media
Inside China
The Qinghai Tibetan Radio station broadcasts in Amdolese Tibetan on FM 99.7.
Diaspora
Radio Free Asia broadcasts in three Tibetan languages: Standard Tibetan, Khams language and Amdolese language.

See also
Balti language

References

Bibliography
Norbu, Kalsang, Karl Peet, dPal Idan bKra shis, & Kevin Stuart, Modern Oral Amdo Tibetan: A Language Primer. Edwin Mellen Press, 2000.
Hua Kan 华侃主编 (ed). 2001. Vocabulary of Amdo Tibetan dialects [藏语安多方言词汇]. Lanzhou: Gansu People's Press [甘肃民族出版社]. (Contains word lists of the Xiahe County 夏河, Tongren County 同仁, Xunhua County 循化, Hualong County 化隆, Hongyuan County 红原, and Tianjun County 天峻 dialects in Gansu and Qinghai provinces.)

External links 

The Tibetan Phrasebook - A Phrasebook of Modern Amdo Tibetan
A Bibliography of Tibetan Linguistics
A Week in Rebkong, Amdo, an Amdo primer
AHP43 Amdo Tibetan Language

Bodic languages
Qinghai
Languages of Tibet
Tibet
Languages written in Tibetan script
Non-tonal languages in tonal families